Safar ( Journey) is a 1970 Indian Hindi romantic drama film produced by the Mushir-Riaz duo and directed by Asit Sen, based on a novel by Bengali writer Ashutosh Mukherjee. The film stars Ashok Kumar, Rajesh Khanna, Sharmila Tagore and Feroz Khan in lead roles. The film became the tenth top-grossing production of the year. It won one Filmfare Awards and four Bengal Film Journalists' Association Awards. Rajesh Khanna received  a nomination for BFJA Awards for Best Actor (Hindi). Asit Sen remade the 1956 Bengali film Chalachal, which was directed by him, in Hindi as Safar (1970). As per review by critics, Safar was carried more than ably by Khanna's immense charm at the peak of his popularity. Rajesh Khanna beautifully conveys his character's desperation and his conviction that surviving by a slender thread is not really living. This film is counted among the 17 consecutive hit films of Rajesh Khanna between 1969 and 1971, by adding the two-hero films Maryada and Andaz to the 15 consecutive solo hits he gave from 1969 to 1971.

The music of the film was a phenomenal hit during the 1970s and remains so.

Plot
The movie starts with the desperate attempt of surgeon Dr. Neela (Sharmila Tagore) to save a patient, who she knew wasn't going to survive. She works under the guidance of Dr. Chandra (Ashok Kumar), who tells her that however hard doctors might try, sometimes a patient won't survive. The story drifts into a flashback. Neela meets Avinash (Rajesh Khanna) at medical college and after an initial misunderstanding, grows close to him. Avinash is a poor man who works while attending medical college. He is a skilled commercial artist too, and Neela finds out that most of the portraits he paints are of her. Though Avinash admires Neela very much, he never talks about love or marriage. Everyone thinks that it's because of his financial status, but it is later revealed that it is because he is suffering from terminal cancer.

Neela, due to financial troubles, starts working as a tutor where she meets her student's (Mahesh Kothare) elder brother, businessman Shekhar Kapoor (Feroz Khan). Shekhar falls in love with her. He meets her elder brother Kalidas (I. S. Johar) to ask for her hand in marriage. Kalidas instead directs him to Avinash saying that Neela would heed his counsel. Shekhar is puzzled but meets Avinash nevertheless, who warmly approves of him and recommends him to Neela. Neela is shocked to learn that Avinash has blood cancer and cannot marry her. After an intense scene where he persuades her to settle down with the "wealthy, healthy" Shekhar, she finally agrees to marry Shekhar. The couple are initially happy together, but Shekhar always feels that Neela does not love him as much as he loves her. Facing losses in business, he desires Neela's sympathy but does not reveal his troubles to her. His insecurity prompts him to make his younger brother Montu stalk Neela everywhere she goes, fuelling marital discord.

Moreover, Neela regularly visits her brother's house where Avinash was a frequent visitor. She also visits Avinash's place. Shekhar slowly grows suspicious of Neela and Avinash and asks his younger brother to spy on her. Later he finds a "love letter", which was once written by Avinash as he imitated Neela's handwriting just for fun. However, in a grave misunderstanding, Shekhar thinks that Neela has indeed written that love note to Avinash and becomes devastated. He wants to set her free from their marriage, and ends up dying by suicide. Police suspect that Neela killed him and arrest her for murder.

In a surprising twist during the trial, Shekhar's mother Mrs. Kapoor (Nadira), who was always hostile to her daughter-in-law, testifies in favour of her unblemished character. The court acquits Neela. Later it is revealed that Avinash left to get away from their marital lives not knowing that Shekhar had committed suicide. He comes back in the final stage of his disease and dies in Dr. Chandra's hospital. Heart-broken and devastated, Neela has lost the will to live, but Dr. Chandra consoles her and takes her under his wing to make her a great surgeon like him. The film ends with Neela sending her brother-in-law Montu (Mahesh Kothare) abroad for studies and dedicating her life to the medical profession.

Cast
 Ashok Kumar as  Dr. Chandra
 Sharmila Tagore as  Dr. Neela
 Rajesh Khanna as  Avinash
 Feroz Khan as  Shekhar Kapoor
 I. S. Johar as Kalidas
 Aruna Irani as Laxmi, wife of Kalidas
 Nadira as Mrs. Kapoor
 Nandita Thakur as singer at studio
 Mahesh Kothare

Crew
 Producer: Mohammad Riaz
 Director: Asit Sen
 Story: Ashutosh Mukherjee
 Screenplay: Asit Sen
 Dialogues: Inder Raj Anand
 Lyrics: Indeevar
 Music: Kalyanji Anandji
 Choreography: Kamal Bose
 Editing: Tarun Dutta
 Art direction: Sudhendu Roy
 Costume Design: Shalini Shah

Reception and awards
Safar became the tenth highest-grossing film of the year in India. In a retrospective review, Rediff.com wrote: "Safar is a story of ordinary people grappling with staggering challenges and compromises. But in this refreshingly non-melodramatic fare, a murmur of protest, an escaped sob and a half-concealed smirk are the only emotional luxuries its characters afford themselves in the inexplicable journey of life, the eponymous safar of the title."

Safar received two nominations at the annual Filmfare Awards and won one award. Asit Sen received his first Best Director award (he was previously nominated in this category for Mamta in 1967), though the film was not nominated for the Best Film award. Sharmila Tagore received her second Best Actress nomination (she won the previous year for Aradhana). Awards and nominations are listed below:
Won, Filmfare Best Director Award - Asit Sen
Nominated, Filmfare Best Actress Award - Sharmila Tagore
The Bengal Film Journalists' Association acknowledged Safar as the eighth best Indian film of 1970, and gave it three more awards:
BFJA Awards, Best Screenplay (Hindi) - Asit Sen
BFJA Awards, Best Dialogue (Hindi) - Inder Raj Anand
BFJA Awards, Best Editing (Hindi) - Tarun Dutta

Tagore won the Madras Film Fans Associations' Award for Best Actress.

Music

The soundtrack of the film contains 5 songs. The music is composed by Kalyanji Anandji, with lyrics authored by Indeevar.

References

External links

1970 films
1970s Hindi-language films
Films scored by Kalyanji Anandji
Films based on Indian novels
Films based on works by Ashutosh Mukhopadhyay